Charles Francis Fleming (May 28, 1877 – May 17, 1944) was an American football player, and a starting quarterback and placekicker for the University of Notre Dame.

Fleming began the 1898 season by leading Notre Dame to a 5-0 victory over Illinois, including kicking the winning field goal.  But following a win over Michigan State, the team traveled to Ann Arbor for the first time only to be shut out by Michigan, 23-0.  Later, Fleming's team was matched up against Indiana for the first time, but fell to the Hoosiers, 11-5.  The team would finish the season with a mark of 4-2.

Following his graduation, Fleming settled in Fort Dodge, Iowa, and later in River Grove, Illinois.

References

1877 births
1944 deaths
American football quarterbacks
Notre Dame Fighting Irish football players
Sportspeople from Fort Dodge, Iowa
People from Covington, Tennessee